The York River is a navigable estuary, approximately  long, in eastern Virginia in the United States. Its watershed drains an area of the coastal plain of Virginia north and east of Richmond.

Its banks were inhabited by indigenous peoples for thousands of years.  In 2003 evidence was found of the likely site of Werowocomoco, one of two capitals used by the paramount chief Powhatan before 1609.  The site was inhabited since 1200 as a major village.  Enormously important in later U.S. history, the river was also the scene of early settlements of the Virginia Colony.  It was the site of significant events and battles in both the American Revolutionary War and the American Civil War.

Description

U.S. Highway 17 crosses the estuary from Yorktown to Gloucester Point on the George P. Coleman Memorial Bridge.

History 
The York River was formerly known as the Pamunkey River by the Native Americans.  Colonists of the Virginia Company in the 17th century first called it the Charles River.  On the north bank (the Middle Peninsula), in what is now Gloucester County, the chief of the Powhatan Confederacy maintained Werowocomoco, one of two capitals of the paramount chiefdom at the time of European contact before 1609.  In 2002-2003, archeological evidence was found of an extensive ancient settlement on the York River at Purtan Bay.  With excavations since then, researchers have concluded this is likely the site of Werowocomoco.  They have found evidence of a large residential village inhabited since 1200 CE, with major earthworks constructed in 1400 CE, more than  200 years prior to the English colonists.  In 2006 the Werowocomoco Archeological Site was listed on the National Register of Historic Places. Excavations continue by a team from the College of William and Mary, the Virginia Department of Natural History and representatives of Virginia descendant tribes of the Powhatan.

The peninsula formed by the York and the James rivers just to the south became the scene of the end campaign of the American Revolutionary War in October 1781. The British Army under Cornwallis at Yorktown found itself cornered by the Americans under George Washington on land and by the French fleet at sea. The ensuing American victory at the Battle of Yorktown forced the surrender of Cornwallis and the end of the war in the east. During the American Civil War, the same area became the theater of the Peninsular Campaign of 1862.

York River State Park is located along the southern shore northwest of Yorktown in James City County. Also on the south shore are several large military reservations, including Camp Peary and the Naval Weapons Station Yorktown (and Cheatham Annex) of the U.S. Navy.  Large areas of preserved wetlands and forest are considered ecologically important to migratory waterfowl. The National Park Service's Colonial Parkway provides a route through a portion of this natural area between Williamsburg and Yorktown.

Crossing

The only vehicular crossing of the York River is the George P. Coleman Memorial Bridge, a swing-type drawbridge which carries U.S. Highway 17 between Yorktown and Gloucester Point. The toll bridge, which was rebuilt and expanded in the mid-1990s, collects a $2 toll for automobile traffic; the fee is collected only from northbound drivers. The bridge has been one of the sites of a special program to establish and encourage nesting locations for the peregrine falcon population of Virginia.

See also
Tue Marshes Light
List of Virginia rivers

References

External links
York River State Park
York River Watershed 

 
Tributaries of the Chesapeake Bay
Rivers of Virginia
Rivers of King William County, Virginia
Rivers of Hanover County, Virginia
Rivers of York County, Virginia
Rivers of Gloucester County, Virginia
Rivers of James City County, Virginia